Daniel Zlotin  (Ukrainian: Даніель Злотін, born June 8, 1984 in Kharkiv, Ukrainian SSR) is a German director, producer, cameraman and film editor of Ukrainian origin living in Cologne. Since 2002 he has created more than 600 music videos for music artists. In 2007 Zlotin co-founded StreetCinema production company, which he co-owned until its closure in 2018.

Career 
Daniel Zlotin was born in 1984 in Kharkiv, Ukraine. He attended the Interregional Academy of Personnel Management in Kyiv (Межрегиональная академия управления персоналом).  At the same time he pursued a musical career as a rapper. In early 2003 he completed his first music video for the song he had recorded with three other rappers. Zlotin presented this video to regional TV stations, some of which included it in their program. Upon receiving positive feedback and requests from a number of Ukrainian hip-hop musicians, he decided to focus on the production of music videos. In 2004 he moved to Cologne to study media design for picture and sound at the Georg-Simon-Ohm vocational college. As his final project, Zlotin shot a short film "Das Geburtstagsgeschenk", where the rapper Eko Fresh appears for the first time as an actor.

In 2007, together with Christian Schmitz and Malic Bargiel, Zlotin founded the media production company, StreetCinema, in Cologne, with which he subsequently produced commercials, image films and music videos. The company mostly specialized in the production of music videos, whereby they were responsible for the whole production process, from the conception through the technical implementation to post-production. Initially, StreetCinema mainly shot music videos for Eko Fresh and members of its German Dream label such as Farid Bang, Capkekz, SDiddy, Summer Cem and Manuellsen. In 2011 Zlotin began to shoot for pop musicians such as Revolverheld, Menowin Fröhlich, Tom Gaebel, Maite Kelly and Willi Herren. Later, while working on the video Massaka Kokain 2 of Massiv, he collaborated for the first time with Kollegah, the rapper contracted by the Selfmade Records. Zlotin continued to collaborate with the Düsseldorf label, for video creations by Favorite, Karate Andi and the 257ers, followed by a series of productions with Xatar and SSIO of Alles oder Nix Records.

According to Zlotin, the years 2013 and 2014 represented the boom phase of StreetCinema. Six to seven projects per month were realized during this time. Among others, first videos for Olli Banjo, KC Rebell and artists from Bushido´s music label Ersguterjunge, such as Baba Saad and Shindy, were created during this period. With the video Bleib in der Schule cooperation with artists from the music label Trailerpark was started. As of 2015, Zlotin made several videos for Majoe, Jasko, Mike Singer and MC Bilal. A year later, he completed his biggest project yet - a music video Boom Boom, which he co-directed with Said Naciri. The music video of RedOne, Daddy Yankee and French Montana received 23 million views on the first day. After one year, it has achieved nearly 120 million views. StreetCinema was dissolved with the approval of all three shareholders in the spring of 2018. Since then, Zlotin has been working under his own brand.

Filmography

Music videos (selection)

Documentations

Short films

Awards 
Due to his collaboration on a variety of German hip-hop albums Zlotin has received thirteen gold records.  Thus he was awarded for the albums Jung, brutal, gutaussehend 2 of Kollegah and Farid Bang, King and Imperator of Kollegah, Killa of Farid Bang, Sonny Black of Bushido, Musik ist keine Lösung of Alligatoah and Abstand of KC rebel as well as the singles Trauerfeierleid and Du bist schön  of Alligatoah, Bleib in der Schule  of Trailerpark, Ya Salam by Kurdo and iPhone 17 and Fata Morgana by KC Rebel.

References

External links 
 Homepage of Daniel Zlotin
 

German music video directors
Film people from Cologne
Film people from Kharkiv
Ukrainian emigrants to Germany
1984 births
Living people